The TSV Vestenbergsgreuth is a German association football club from the village of Vestenbergsgreuth, Franconia. From 1996 to 2007, the club did not field a team due to a merger with SpVgg Fürth, but has since returned to competitive football as a separate side.

TSV is best known for its 1–0 victory over FC Bayern Munich in the opening round of the 1994–95 DFB-Pokal, which eliminated that club from cup play just three months after they had claimed the Bundesliga title.

History

Beginnings
Formed on 1 February 1974 in the small village of Vestenbergsgreuth, the club entered the local C-Klasse Bamberg Gruppe 3 (VIII), then the lowest division in the region. Greuth was an immediate success in the league, winning it unbeaten and earning the right to play against FC Wacker Trailsdorf for promotion, a game which was won 2–1 in front of 2,000 spectators.

Rise
The season after, the club took out the league championship again, now in the B-Klasse Bamberg Gruppe 3 (VII) and was promoted once more. However, it did suffer a couple of first league defeats. At the beginning of the next season, the club opened its current ground on 1 August 1976 with a friendly against SpVgg Fürth, which ended in a 1–1 draw.

In the A-Klasse Erlangen-Forchheim (VI) in 1976–77, the club's rise came to a brief halt when it "only" finished fourth. By leaving the Bamberg region for Erlangen, the club had also made the transition from the Oberfranken FA to the Mittelfranken FA. The season after, it missed out on the title by one point, finishing second. In its third attempt, Greuth then won the league in 1978–79 and earned promotion to the Bezirksliga Mittelfranken-Nord (V). In an unusual friendly, the club played a football match against the ice hockey team of CSKA Moscow and lost 1–2.

The Bezirksliga proved to be less of a hindrance to the club's rise than the A-Klasse was and it won the league in its first season there. It also remained unbeaten during the regular season but then lost the first promotion decider to TuS Feuchtwangen 1–2, in front of 4,000 spectators. In the second decider however, now against TSV Lindberg, the club managed to win 4–2 and earn promotion to the Landesliga Bayern-Mitte (IV).

Landesliga years
The Landesliga proved more difficult than the Bezirksliga and the club ended up on ninth rank in midfield, on level points, a new situation for the team. The following season saw a decline in performance and the team could only finish twelfth but the formation of a youth team was a positive development for the club. Greuth started to become a fixture in the mid- to lower-table ranks of the Landesliga, even having to survive a relegation match against ASV Herzogenaurach (5–3 after penalties for TSV) in 1984, until in 1984–85, some progress could be made with a fourth spot. The next season, the team improved by a spot and also won the local Middle Franconian Cup (German: Mittelfranken Pokal) with a 1–0 victory over 1. FC Nürnberg II. It missed out on qualifying for the German Cup when losing 1–3 to FC Augsburg on state level.

The 1986–87 season became the highlight of the club's history so far. Winning the Landesliga championship and therefore earning promotion to the Amateur Oberliga Bayern (III), the highest league in the state of Bavaria, the team managed to win all 17 of its home games. Greuth also won the Mittelfranken Cup again, through a 2–1 victory in extra time against Südwest Nürnberg. This time, on state level, it succeeded, too, beating FC Bayern Hof 2–0 and earning the right to play in the 1987–88 DFB-Pokal.

Bayernliga years
The club's first appearance in the German Cup was a short one, a 0–4 defeat against SV Darmstadt 98 of the 2. Bundesliga ended its progress. In the Bayernliga, Vestenbergsgreuth continued its amazing performance, taking the league by surprise. The club's unbeaten series at home came to an end on 12 December 1987 when a 0–1 defeat to SpVgg Unterhaching ended 26-month of being unbeaten at home. Unterhaching was also the team, that Greuth came second to in its first year in the third division. Through this, the club qualified for the German amateur football championship, where it reached the semi-finals before being knocked out by the VfB Oldenburg.

In its second year in the league, the team came third but managed to take out the Mittelfranken Cup for a third time, with a 1–0 after extra time over the Spvgg Fürth. The team however failed to reach the German Cup again, being knocked out by the SpVgg Plattling in the state finals. With a fourth place in the Bayernliga and a lost Mittelfranken Cup final, to Fürth, the next season was a little less successful. In 1990–91, the team dropped to a tenth place and again lost the cup final to Fürth.

The 1991–92 season became something of a repeat of 1987–88. Again, the club finished runners-up to SpVgg Unterhaching and again it played in the German amateur championship. Two wins, a draw and a loss meant, the team failed to reach the final. On the positive side, the club's under-19 side achieved promotion to the A-Jugend Bayernliga Nord, the highest league at this level, where it was able to measure itself on the youth side of the 1. FC Nürnberg. The year after, the club finished fourth in the league again, which was important because the 1992, 1993 and 1994 placings were what counted to qualify for the new Regionalliga Süd, which was to start in 1994.

In its last Bayernliga year to-date, the club finished only eighth but it proved to be enough to gain one of the six available spots to the Regionalliga for 1994–95. Another Cup win, 6–2 against the SpVgg Ansbach, followed by a win over Schwaben Cup winner SC Altenmünster, meant qualification to the 1994–95 DFB-Pokal.

Regionalliga years

The Cup game
On 14 August 1994, in the first round of the German Cup, the club shot to fame: Beating the German champions FC Bayern Munich 1–0 in the Frankenstadion in Nuremberg, the goal having been scored by Roland Stein. It was Bayern's first competitive match under new manager Giovanni Trapattoni and one of the greatest upsets in German Cup history. Bayern had to "live with the humiliation", as Lothar Matthäus put it and, apart from making front page in Germany and Italy, like in the Gazzetta dello Sport, even a memorial stone was erected. For Bayern, it was not the first lapse either, the club had already lost to the amateurs of FV Weinheim in 1990 and in later years lost to 1. FC Magdeburg, too. Rumor has it that, when FSV Erlangen-Bruck shortly after knocked out Greuth from the Mittelfranken Cup, Uli Hoeneß send a telegram to the Erlangen club, congratulating them.

Greuth marched on to the second round, beating FC Homburg there and finally lost to VfL Wolfsburg in the third round in a penalty shoot out.

As a footnote, the club came fifth in the new Regionalliga.

Last season
The 1995–96 season was the last for the club in competitive football, for the time, finishing in a respectable sixth place. From there, the club went into a merger with the SpVgg Fürth, which had been decided upon in 1995 for financial reasons, to form SpVgg Greuther Fürth, the Greuther in the new name reflecting the TSV Vestenbergsgreuth heritage. The new logo included the wooden shoe from the Vestenbergsgreuth logo to also indicate that the new club was more than just a continuation of Fürth. The new club managed to finish second in the Regionalliga and earn promotion to the 2nd Bundesliga.

Revival
In 2007, the club decided to field a senior side again. Doing so, the club had to enter the lowest local league, which was now the A-Klasse Erlangen/Pegnitzgrund-Gruppe 3 (X). It won, in club tradition, a championship and promotion in its first season. In this league, it met another Bavarian club who had seen better days, the ASV Herzogenaurach.

Since 2008 the club has played in the Kreisklasse Erlangen/Pegnitzgrund 2, now the ninth tier of the Bavarian football league system.

Honours
The club's honours:

League
 Amateur Oberliga Bayern (III)
 Runners-up: (2) 1988, 1992
 Landesliga Bayern-Mitte (IV)
 Champions: 1987
 Bezirksliga Mittelfranken-Nord (V)
 Champions: 1980
 A-Klasse Erlangen-Forchheim (VI)
 Champions: 1979
 B-Klasse Bamberg Gruppe 3 (VII)
 Champions: 1976
 C-Klasse Bamberg Gruppe 3 (VIII)
 Champions: 1975
 A-Klasse Erlangen/Pegnitzgrund-Gruppe 3 (X)
 Champions: 2008

Cup
 Mittelfranken Cup
 Winners: (4) 1986, 1987, 1989, 1994
 Runners-up: (2) 1990, 1991

Indoor
 Bavarian indoor championship
 Winners: 1993

Managers
Former managers of the club until 1996:
 Norbert Klaus, Alfons Scharold: 1974–75
 Hans Klever: 1975
 Herbert Graf: 1976
 Heiner Vitzethum: 8/1976 – 6/1983
 Heinz Keck: 7/1983 – 2/1991
 Rudi Sturz: 2/1991 – 5/1991
 Paul Hesselbach: 7/1991 – 6/1993
 Hubert Müller: 7/1993 – 4/1994
 Paul Hesselbach: 4/1994 – 6/1996

Chairmen
The club had only two chairmen up until the merger in 1996:
 Gerhard Kilian: 1 February 1974 – 23 October 1984
 Helmut Hack: 23 October 1984 – 13 May 1997
 Helmut Lottes: current

Nicknames
While Greuth is an abbreviation Vestenbergsgreuth and quite easy to understand in its origins, the second nickname needs some explanation. Teekicker (English: tea kicker) derives from the fact that the club was financially strongly supported by a local tea retailing company, run by Hans Wedel, a founding member of the club. For a while, the company sold a special "1–0 Tea" after the cup victory.

Support
Considering the small size of the village of Vestenbergsgreuth (population: 1,627), the club was well supported with the following league attendance averages in its final seasons:

 Source: Oberliga/Regionalliga Yearbooks 1987 – 1996, publisher: DSFS

Recent seasons
The recent season-by-season performance of the club:

With the introduction of the Bezirksoberligas in 1988 as the new fifth tier, below the Landesligas, all leagues below dropped one tier. With the introduction of the Regionalligas in 1994 and the 3. Liga in 2008 as the new third tier, below the 2. Bundesliga, all leagues below dropped one tier. With the establishment of the Regionalliga Bayern as the new fourth tier in Bavaria in 2012 the Bayernliga was split into a northern and a southern division, the number of Landesligas expanded from three to five and the Bezirksoberligas abolished. All leagues from the Bezirksligas onward were elevated one tier.

DFB-Pokal appearances
The club has qualified for the first round of the German Cup a number of times:

References

External links
Official team site
Abseits Guide to German Soccer – SpVgg Greuther Fürth
TSV Vestenbergsgreuth profile at Weltfussball.de
Das deutsche Fußball-Archiv Historical German domestic league tables 
Helmut Hack awarded the "Verdienstkreuz am Bande" – the Federal Cross of Merit on ribbon Article on Helmut Hack, former chairman
Zittern vor den Amateuren List of Bundesliga clubs who were knocked out of the DFB-Pokal by amateur teams 

Football clubs in Germany
Football clubs in Bavaria
Association football clubs established in 1974
SpVgg Greuther Fürth
Football in Middle Franconia
1974 establishments in West Germany
Erlangen-Höchstadt